Selsko meso ("village meat") is a Balkan pork and mushroom stew. Typical ingredients include pork, onion bits, smoked meat, ground beef, tomatoes or ketchup, cream cheese, mushrooms, peppers, spices, wine, and salt. It is traditionally prepared in a clay pot.

Ingredients 

 Pork
 Onion pieces
 Smoked meat
 Ground beef
 Tomatoes/Ketchup
 Cream cheese
 Mushrooms
 Peppers, spices and salt
 Wine

See also
Macedonian Cuisine
List of mushroom dishes

References

Balkan cuisine
Macedonian cuisine
Mushroom dishes
Pork dishes
Stews